Vladimir Vladimirovich Zhmudsky (born 23 January 1947 in Dublyany, Ukrainian SSR) is a Ukrainian water polo player who competed for the Soviet Union in the 1972.

See also
 Soviet Union men's Olympic water polo team records and statistics
 List of Olympic champions in men's water polo
 List of Olympic medalists in water polo (men)
 List of World Aquatics Championships medalists in water polo

External links
 

1947 births
Living people
Sportspeople from Moscow
Soviet male water polo players
Ukrainian male water polo players
Olympic water polo players of the Soviet Union
Water polo players at the 1972 Summer Olympics
Olympic gold medalists for the Soviet Union
Olympic medalists in water polo
Medalists at the 1972 Summer Olympics
Sportspeople from Lviv Oblast